The 2007 Prix de l'Arc de Triomphe was a horse race held at Longchamp on Sunday 7 October 2007. It was the 86th running of the Prix de l'Arc de Triomphe.

The winner was Dylan Thomas, a four-year-old colt trained in Ireland by Aidan O'Brien. The winning jockey was Kieren Fallon.

There was a thirty-minute stewards' inquiry after the race, but the original placings were left unchanged.

Race details
 Sponsor: Groupe Lucien Barrière
 Purse: €2,000,000; First prize: €1,142,800 
 Going: Good to Soft
 Distance: 2,400 metres
 Number of runners: 12
 Winner's time: 2m 28.5s

Full result

 Abbreviations: shd = short-head; hd = head; snk = short-neck

Winner's details
Further details of the winner, Dylan Thomas.
 Sex: Colt
 Foaled: 23 April 2003
 Country: Ireland
 Sire: Danehill; Dam: Lagrion (Diesis)
 Owners: Sue Magnier and Michael Tabor
 Breeder: Tower Bloodstock

References

External links
 Colour Chart – Arc 2007

Prix de l'Arc de Triomphe
 2007
Prix de l'Arc de Triomphe
Prix de l'Arc de Triomphe
Prix de l'Arc de Triomphe